Grass Lake is an unincorporated community in Grass Lake Township, Kanabec County, Minnesota, United States.

Notes

Unincorporated communities in Kanabec County, Minnesota
Unincorporated communities in Minnesota